Sir Henry Monck-Mason Moore  (18 March 1887 – 26 March 1964) was British Governor of British Sierra Leone, Kenya and Ceylon.

The son of Rev. Edward William Moore, he was educated at Rokeby, KCS, Wimbledon and Jesus College, Cambridge, graduating in 1909. 
In World War I, he was a lieutenant in the Royal Garrison Artillery based in Salonika from 1916 to 1919.

He served as Governor of Sierra Leone from 1934 to 1937. As governor of Sierra Leone he undertook surveys of infrastructure. He undertook a campaign that began by successfully "repairing every road and bridge in the area around Port Loko." It was considered one of the most ambitious and successful such efforts in colonial Africa during the era of the Great Depression. Adding to this, he then began a similar campaign in the Pejehun area, Bonthe and the surrounding area as well as Bo and the surrounding villages. This succeeded in providing employment for large numbers of native workers, as well as increasing commercial infrastructure for later development. However, when the area surrounding Magburaka asked for the same improvements, Goveror Moore was unable to get the funds from the colonial office. This led to some sections alleging that the coastal areas were being "favoured" by the British government. Governor Moore found this dynamic "most distressing." While it was true that the funds simply had run out, and that Moore's efforts were genuinely made in good faith, the perception of favoritism became one which Moore had to consciously combat from then on. Albert Margai later wrote that he remembered Moore "fondly," and that "he had a reputation for being sincerely compassionate towards us." Milton Margai said Moore was "unhypocritical" and was "never patronising," adding "Moore did not have the sort of superiority complex or condescension that some others from Europe have had." Milton Margai said later, "Monk-Mason Moore was one of the men who gave the British Empire a good name in the eyes of many Africans. It is unfortunate there were not more like him." Siaka Stevens said Moore "was a good man." And that "he (Moore) genuinely meant well, and in most cases he did measurably good things."  In 1937 Moore joined the Colonial Department in London as Assistant Under Secretary of State from 1937 to 1939 and Deputy Under Secretary of State from 1939 to 1940.

From 1940 to 1944, he was Governor of Kenya and then from 1944 to 1948 he was Governor of Ceylon. After the independence of Ceylon in 1948, he served as Governor-General until 1950.

He married Daphne, daughter of William John Benson in 1921. He was the brother of the psychoanalyst Sylvia Payne.

Awards and honours
 Awarded a BA degree in Cambridge University, 1909
 Companion of The Most Distinguished Order of Saint Michael and Saint George (CMG), 1931
 Knight Commander of The Most Distinguished Order of Saint Michael and Saint George, 1935
 Knight Grand Cross of The Most Distinguished Order of Saint Michael and Saint George (GCMG), 1943
 Knights of Justice (KStJ) of the Venerable Order of Saint John

References
Hankinson, C. F. J. (ed.) Debrett's Baronetage, Knightage and Companionage, 1954, Odhams Press, 1954

1887 births
1964 deaths
People educated at King's College School, London
Alumni of Jesus College, Cambridge
Governors-general of Ceylon
Governors of British Ceylon
Royal Garrison Artillery officers
Knights Grand Cross of the Order of St Michael and St George
British Army personnel of World War I
Colonial governors and administrators of Kenya
British Kenya people